Harry Bulpit (7 April 1895 – 8 August 1990) was an Australian rules footballer who played with South Melbourne in the Victorian Football League (VFL).

Notes

External links 

1895 births
1990 deaths
Australian rules footballers from Victoria (Australia)
Sydney Swans players
Footscray Football Club (VFA) players